Take a Chance may refer to:

Film, television and theatre 
 Take a Chance (1918 film), a silent comedy directed by Hal Roach
 Take a Chance (1933 film), a film adapted from the 1932 musical (see below), starring James Dunn
 Take a Chance (1937 film), a film featuring Kynaston Reeves
 Take a Chance (2006 film), a direct-to-video comedy starring Kirby Heyborne
 Take a Chance (Australian game show), an Australian game show starting in 1959
 Take a Chance (Canadian game show), a Canadian radio quiz show and 1960s TV quiz show
 Take a Chance (American game show), a 1950 game show
 Take a Chance (musical), a 1932 Broadway comedy with Ethel Merman

Music 
 Take a Chance (Ardijah album), or the title song
 Take a Chance (Joanne Brackeen album), or the title composition
 Take a Chance (Stockton's Wing album), or the title song
 "Take a Chance" (Robin Bengtsson song), 2020
 "Take a Chance" (Scouting for Girls song)
 "Take a Chance", a song by The Magic Numbers from Those the Brokes
 "Take a Chance", a song by melody. from the single "realize"/"Take a Chance"
 "Take a Chance", a song by Ratt from Dancing Undercover
 "Take a Chance", an opening theme for Yu-Gi-Oh! Zexal
 "Take a Chance", a 1983 Italo disco classic by Mr. Flagio
 "Take a Chance", a 1983 duet by Olivia Newton-John and John Travolta which was the B-side of "Twist of Fate" (Olivia Newton-John song)

See also
 Take a Chance on Me (disambiguation)